Bradley University is a private university in Peoria, Illinois. Founded in 1897, Bradley University  enrolls 5,400 students who are pursuing degrees in more than 100 undergraduate programs and more than 30 graduate programs in five colleges. The university is accredited by the Higher Learning Commission and 22 specialized and professional accreditors.

History
 The Bradley Polytechnic Institute was founded by philanthropist Lydia Moss Bradley in 1897 in memory of her husband Tobias and their six children, all of whom died before Bradley, leaving her a childless widow. The Bradleys had discussed establishing an orphanage in memory of their deceased children. After some study and travel to various institutions, Mrs. Bradley decided instead to found a school where young people could learn how to do practical things to prepare them for living in the modern world. As a first step toward her goal, in 1892 she purchased a controlling interest in Parsons Horological School in LaPorte, Indiana, the first school for watchmakers in America, and moved it to Peoria. She specified in her will that the school should be expanded after her death to include a classical education as well as industrial arts and home economics: "...it being the first object of this Institution to furnish its students with the means of living an independent, industrious and useful life by the aid of a practical knowledge of the useful arts and sciences."

In October 1896 Mrs. Bradley was introduced to Dr. William Rainey Harper, president of the University of Chicago. He soon convinced her to move ahead with her plans and establish the school during her lifetime. Bradley Polytechnic Institute was chartered on November 13, 1896. Mrs. Bradley provided  of land, $170,000 for buildings, equipment, and a library, and $30,000 per year for operating expenses.

Contracts for Bradley Hall and Horology Hall (now Westlake) were awarded in April and work moved ahead quickly. Fourteen faculty and 150 students began classes in Bradley Hall on October 4—with 500 workers still hammering away. (The Horological Department added another eight faculty and 70 students.) Bradley Polytechnic Institute was formally dedicated on October 8, 1897. Its first graduate, in June 1898, was Cora Unland.

Originally, the institute was organized as a four-year academy as well as a two-year college. There was only one other high school in the city of Peoria at the time. By 1899 the institute had expanded to accommodate nearly 500 pupils, and study fields included biology, chemistry, food work, sewing, English, German, French, Latin, Greek, history, manual arts, drawing, mathematics, and physics. By 1920 the institute dropped the academy orientation and adopted a four-year collegial program. Enrollment continued to grow over the coming decades and the name Bradley University was adopted in 1946.

The first music building on Bradley's Campus was built in 1930 and named after Jennie Meta Constance (the English department), who was murdered on August 28, 1928. In 1962 the building was renovated to become the music building of Bradley's Campus. Only approximately $2,500 was spent renovating the building, most of the money was spent turning a kitchen into a classroom. In 2002 more renovations were made to Constance Hall to modernize it and make it more spacious. The renovation included an elevator and more office space.

Academics

Bradley University was ranked #2 among 157 Midwest Regional Universities in the 2022 edition of America's Best Colleges published by U.S. News & World Report. The annual survey also recognized Bradley as the 36th "best value" Midwestern school in the ranking of Great Schools at Great Prices.

The Bradley University Department of Teacher Education and College of Education and Health Sciences is NCATE-approved. Additionally, Bradley University's Foster College of Business is one of less than 2% of business schools worldwide to achieve and maintain AACSB International accreditation for both business and accounting programs.

Bradley University is organized into the following colleges and schools:

Undergraduate colleges
College of Education and Health Sciences
Caterpillar College of Engineering and Technology
College of Liberal Arts and Sciences
Foster College of Business
Slane College of Communications and Fine Arts
Turner School of Entrepreneurship and Innovation

Students without a declared major may also be admitted to the Academic Exploration Program (AEP).

The university is also home to the Charley Steiner School of Sports Communication, the first such named school in the U.S.

Graduate school
Through the Graduate School, Bradley University offers Masters level graduate degrees in five of its colleges: business, communication and fine arts, education and health sciences, engineering, and liberal arts and sciences. Each has its own hourly requirements and varies in completion time. The program of physical therapy offers a Doctor of Physical Therapy degree.

Turner School of Entrepreneurship and Innovation
Bradley University is among the first universities in the nation to have a school of entrepreneurship and the first established as a freestanding academic unit. The Turner School of Entrepreneurship and Innovation is named in honor of Bob and Carolyn Turner, long-time supporters of Bradley.  The Turners established the Robert and Carolyn Turner Center for Entrepreneurship in 2002. Dr. Gerald Hills, the school's founding academic executive director, received the Karl Vesper Entrepreneurship Pioneer Award in 2012 and the Babson Lifetime Award in 2011. Hills served as the Turner Chair of Entrepreneurship until he retired in December 2014.

Entrepreneur magazine and The Princeton Review ranked Bradley's undergraduate entrepreneurship program among the top 25 programs in the nation.

Bradley is headquarters for the national Collegiate Entrepreneurs' Organization (CEO), with CEO student chapters at 240 universities.

Tuition and financial aid 
As of the 2021–2022 school year, students who are enrolled full-time at Bradley University pay $35,940 for tuition. Students living in the residence halls on campus pay an additional $11,628 for room and board, along with a $420 activity and health fee. The total cost for full-time students living on campus is $47,988. The university offers hundreds of different scholarships and grants from numerous sources such as federal, state and private entities. They provide financial aid in the form of loans, work study, scholarship, and grants. Financial assistance awards are typically received by more than 85% of the university's students.

Campus

Bradley's  campus is located on Peoria's west bluff and is minutes from the city's downtown. The campus of Bradley University is relatively compact. There are few places on campus which cannot be reached from any other part of campus in under ten minutes on foot. Bradley's student housing is concentrated on the campus's east side, and the residence halls include College (transfer community), Geisert, Harper, Heitz, Williams, and Wyckoff Halls. There is also a complex of singles dormitories (Elmwood, Wendle, and Lovelace) and two university-owned apartment complexes: St. James Apartments and the Student Apartment Complex.

Also located on the south side of Bradley's campus is Dingeldine Music Center, which was acquired from the Second Church of Christ, Scientist in 1983. The center serves as the main performance and practice facility for Bradley's instrumental and choral programs.

Bradley University is also the site of Peoria's National Public Radio affiliate, WCBU-FM, located on the second floor of Jobst Hall.

Westlake Hall renovation 
Built in 1897, Westlake Hall is the oldest building on campus and has been utilized as a learning facility for over one hundred years. This building is home to Bradley's College of Education and Health Sciences. In March 2010, this building underwent a $24 million renovation that was officially completed in June 2012. This renovation increased the building to four stories tall consisting of academic classrooms and offices. The building went from 13,500 square ft to 84,500 square ft, six times its original size. The building's signature clock tower and limestone was incorporated into the renovation to keep some of the building's originality. The building was also designed to meet LEED (Leadership in Energy and Environmental Design) gold certification standards, which includes qualities such as energy saving, water efficiencies, and  emission reductions. The remodel was recognized by American School and University for its remarkable design in adaptive reuse.

Athletics

Bradley University is a member of the Missouri Valley Conference. Conference-approved sports at Bradley for men are baseball, basketball, cross country running, golf, indoor and outdoor track, and soccer. Women's' sports consist of basketball, cross country running, golf, indoor and outdoor track, softball, tennis, and volleyball. The men's basketball team has appeared nine times in the NCAA Tournament: 1950, 1954, 1955, 1980, 1986, 1988, 1996, 2006, 2019 and would have appeared in the 2020 NCAA tournament as the MVC Tournament Champions. In 1950 and 1954 they were national runners up in the Final Four, and in 2006 the Braves made their first Sweet Sixteen appearance since 1955, defeating 4th seed Kansas and 5th seed Pittsburgh. Bradley's run came to an end in the Sweet Sixteen with a loss to the University of Memphis. Bradley also won the National Invitation Tournament in 1957, 1960, 1964, and 1982.  In 2008, the men's basketball team was selected to participate in the inaugural College Basketball Invitational. They defeated Cincinnati and Virginia en route to the Championship but lost to Tulsa 2–1 in a 3-game series.

In 2007, the Bradley soccer team defeated Creighton 1–0 to claim their first MVC Tournament Championship and fourth appearance in the NCAA postseason soccer tournament. Following their first ever NCAA tournament game victory over DePaul 2–0, the Braves continued on a magical run to the Elite Eight by defeating seven-time national champion Indiana University on penalty kicks (5–4) and the University of Maryland in overtime, both on the road.  During the Maryland game they were down 2–0 with less than three minutes left and won. The match has been referred to as "The Miracle in Maryland."  Bradley's coach, Jim DeRose, was named the national Coach of the Year by Soccer America after their great season.

Bradley baseball advanced to the College World Series in 1950 and 1956.  In 1956, the team qualified for the Final Four, falling to eventual champion Minnesota in the semifinals. In 2015, the Bradley baseball team received an at-large bid to the NCAA postseason baseball tournament, the school's first appearance in the tournament since 1968. After finishing the regular season with a record of 32–18, the Braves advanced to the Missouri Valley conference tournament championship game by defeating Evansville, Indiana State, and #11 nationally ranked Dallas Baptist and were ultimately defeated by #8 nationally ranked Missouri State 5–2.  After finishing the season with the #19 RPI in the nation and a record of 35–19, the Braves were placed in the Louisville regional as the #2 seed, along with #3 seeded Michigan, #4 seeded Morehead State and #1 seed host Louisville. Video taken at the team's selection show viewing party shows the team excitement when they learned they would be participating in the NCAA tournament.  When the Braves earned a 9–4 victory over Morehead State, they snapped a streak of 9 straight losses in NCAA postseason play dating back to the third round of the College World Series in 1956 when they defeated Wyoming 12–8.

The Bradley men's and women's cross country teams were MVC champions in 2015. In 2016 the men won the MVC championship again and placed 5th at regionals while the women were MVC runner ups.  In 2018, the BU men's cross country team won the MVC yet again and qualified for the NCAA Championship meet in Madison, Wisconsin, where they finished 24th, outpacing their #25 national ranking.

The university does not have a football team.  The football program was disbanded in 1970.

Bradley University was a member of the Illinois Intercollegiate Athletic Conference from 1910 to 1937.

Groups and activities

Speech Team
Bradley University is home to the most successful speech team in the nation, with their American Forensics Association Championship winning streak from 1980 through 2000 only broken in 1994 and 1995.   Bradley has garnered 141 individual national titles and 39 team sweepstakes over the last 30 years. Bradley's forensics team hosts the nation's oldest intercollegiate competition, known as the L.E. Norton Invitational named after former forensics director L.E. Norton. The team also hosts an annual tournament for high school speech teams, known as the George Armstrong Invitational.

Sales Team
Bradley University is home to the most successful sales team in the nation.  Bradley defeated 66 other colleges to win their nation-leading third National Collegiate Sales Competition (NCSC) championship on March 7, 2022, also becoming the first-ever back-to-back national champion.

Greek
More than thirty percent of undergraduate students are involved in fraternities and sororities at Bradley University. The community currently consists of twenty-seven chapters, representing the North American Interfraternity Conference, National Panhellenic Conference, and National Pan-Hellenic Council.  Twenty of the chapters have houses on campus, which are primarily located on the south side of campus.

Active Chapters of the North American Interfraternity Conference

Alpha Epsilon Pi
Delta Tau Delta
Delta Upsilon
Lambda Chi Alpha
Theta Xi
Theta Chi
Pi Kappa Alpha
Pi Kappa Phi
Sigma Alpha Epsilon
Sigma Phi Epsilon
Sigma Chi
Phi Gamma Delta (FIJI)
Phi Kappa Tau

Active Colonies of the North American Interfraternity Conference
Delta Sigma Phi

Active Chapters of the National Panhellenic Conference
Alpha Chi Omega
Chi Omega
Gamma Phi Beta
Kappa Delta
Pi Beta Phi
Sigma Delta Tau
Sigma Kappa
Sigma Lambda Gamma
Sigma Lambda Beta

Active Fraternity Chapters of the National Pan-Hellenic Council (NPHC)
Alpha Phi Alpha
Kappa Alpha Psi

Active Sorority Chapters of the National Pan-Hellenic Council (NPHC)
Alpha Kappa Alpha
Delta Sigma Theta
Sigma Gamma Rho
Zeta Phi Beta

Other social and professional organizations

Epsilon Sigma Alpha  (Service Sorority) 
Alpha Phi Omega (Co-ed Community Service)
Beta Gamma Sigma
Gamma Iota Sigma
Sigma Alpha Iota
Sigma Theta Epsilon
Sigma Phi Delta
Phi Mu Alpha Sinfonia
Kappa Phi Club
Chi Alpha Campus Ministries
Alpha Psi Omega (National Honorary Theatre Fraternity)
Phi Chi Theta
Pi Lambda Theta

Broadside
The annual student literary journal, Broadside, publishes student art and writing in a 100-page journal that is released each spring.  The publication is staffed and run entirely by students.  The organization also holds two readings:  an informal "open mic" night in the fall, and a formal reading in late April which usually features writers published in the journal.

The Scout
The student-run weekly newspaper, The Scout, covers student life and issues on campus, Bradley sports, and local Peoria news that concerns students. Dates for local concerts, movie and music reviews can all be found written by students in The Scout’s "Voice" section. Student staff rotates and changes yearly.

Common Ground

Common Ground provides a supportive, non-judgmental atmosphere in which people in the LGBTQ+ community, as well as their relatives or friends, may explore and discuss the issues facing their lives. Common Ground also offers speakers bureau services, brings speakers to campus, and provides confidential, anonymous, private meetings. All communication made to Common Ground is kept confidential.

Office of Diversity and Inclusion 
The Office of Diversity and Inclusion (ODI) was established to advance Bradley University's commitment to diversity, and enhance underrepresented students' access and success at the university. It is their aim to facilitate dialogue among the campus community that seeks to provide a climate that is supportive, inclusive, and appreciative of diversity and all of its benefits. All communities are welcomed into the Garret Center to enter an environment free of judgment and open to suggestions about rising above the -isms and perceptions of underrepresented groups.

Recognitions

Awards 
"E" Award – In 2009, Bradley's International Trade Center was awarded the Presidential "E" Award for U.S. Exporters. Only 21 awards were given nationally and Bradley's ITC was the only trade center in the country to be recognized.
Fulbright Program – Bradley was ranked sixth nationally among universities of its kind for producing Fulbright students in 2013–2014.
Innovation in Leadership of Business Education Award – Bradley's Foster College of Business was one of three schools to receive this award given by the Mid-Continent East Division of the Association to Advance Collegiate Schools of Business (AACSB).

Rankings 
U.S. News & World Report ranks Bradley University 166th nationally, 2nd Best College among 157 Midwest Regional Universities, and the top Illinois regional university.
Kiplinger's Personal Finance ranked Bradley the #65 private university in the nation in terms of value.
Money magazine ranked Bradley 88 out of 736 colleges and universities that delivers the most value. Schools are considered based on their value of education and their affordable price, that helps students create strong careers.
In The Princeton Review's 2018 "The Best 380 Colleges" list, Bradley was ranked once again. Bradley is consistently one of the 15% of all colleges that are ranked on this list. In the review, Bradley was noted for its wide-ranging academic resources, personal attention to students and class size.
The Wall Street Journal ranked Bradley 164 out of 1,056 colleges and universities in the nation.
Bloomberg Businessweek ranked Bradley's Foster College of Business 42nd in the nation and 10th in the Employer Satisfaction Survey.
The Brookings Institution ranked Bradley the #19 salary boosting college in the nation.
According to career site Zippia, Bradley is the best college in Illinois for landing a job after graduation.
Washington Monthly ranked Bradley the #14 Midwest "Best Bang for the Buck" university and number 50 of 606 nationally for Masters Level Universities.
Animation Career Review ranked Bradley's Game Design program among the top 25 in the United States.

Notable people

See also
 Carver Arena – home court of Bradley men's basketball games

References

External links

 
 Bradley University Athletics website

 
Universities and colleges in Peoria, Illinois
Educational institutions established in 1897
Tourist attractions in Peoria, Illinois
1897 establishments in Illinois
Private universities and colleges in Illinois